The Italy national relays team at the international athletics championships refer to the results of the Italian athletics team (in this page only at senior level), in the races of 4 x 100 metres relay and 4 x 400 metres relay at the International athletics competitions such as Olympic Games, World Championships, European Championships, Summer Universiade, Mediterranean Games, World Military Games and European Athletics Team Championships.

Medal count

Olympic Games
The table shows only the times in which Italy has participated to a final.

4 x 100 m relay

4 x 400 m relay

World Championships
The table shows only the times in which Italy has participated to a final.

4 x 100 m relay

4 x 400 m relay

World Indoor Championships
The table shows only the times in which Italy has reached the podium.

European Championships
The table shows only the times in which Italy has reached the podium.

4 x 100 m relay

4 x 400 m relay

European Indoor Championships
The table shows only the times in which Italy has reached the podium.

World Athletics Relays

Universiade
The table shows only the times in which Italy has reached the podium.

4 x 100 m relay

4 x 400 m relay

Mediterranean Games
The table shows only the times in which Italy has reached the podium.

4 x 100 m relay

4 x 400 m relay

European Cup
The table shows only the times in which Italy has reached the podium just in Super League and, from 2009, at the European Team Championships.

4 x 100 m relay

4 x 400 m relay

Military World Games
The table shows only the times in which Italy has participated to a final.

4 x 100 m relay

4 x 400 m relay

Multiple medalists
Are excluded from the list only to Military World Games medals won since the Italian is not representative of the Italy national athletics team, but that of military sports bodies.

See also
Italian all-time lists - 4 x 100 metres relay
Italian all-time lists - 4 x 400 metres relay
Italy national athletics team
Italy at the World Athletics Relays
Italian records in athletics
Naturalized athletes of Italy

References

External links
Athletics - International Podium Men
Athletics - International Podium Women

Relay team